Homemade Ice Cream is the sixth album released by Tony Joe White, and the third he released for Warner Brothers. It was produced by White and Tom Dowd.

Track listing
All tracks composed by Tony Joe White
Side one
 "Saturday Nite, In Oak Grove, Louisiana" 	2:13
 "For Ol' Times Sake" 	3:47
 "I Want Love ('Tween You and Me)"	2:42
 "Homemade Ice Cream" 	3:12
 "Ol' Mother Earth" 	3:07

Side two
 "Lazy" 3:48
 "California on My Mind" 3:44
 "Backwoods Preacher Man" 2:47
 "Takin' the Midnight Train" 	4:06
 "No News Is Good News" 	3:02
 "Did Somebody Make a Fool out of You"	4:15

Personnel
Tony Joe White - lead vocals, guitar, harmonica
Reggie Young - guitar
David Briggs - piano, organ
Norbert Putnam - bass
Kenny Malone - drums

References

1973 albums
Tony Joe White albums
Warner Records albums
Albums produced by Tony Joe White
Albums produced by Tom Dowd